Latency or latent may refer to:

Science and technology
 Latent heat, energy released or absorbed, by a body or a thermodynamic system, during a constant-temperature process
 Latent variable, a variable that is not directly observed but inferred in statistics

Biology and medicine
 Latency period or latent period, the time between development of a disease or exposure to a pathogen, chemical, or radiation and when symptoms first become apparent (e.g. latent tumor) or when the disease becomes infectious (e.g. infectious disease)
 Latent homosexuality, a term proposed by Sigmund Freud
 Sleep onset latency, the time it takes a person to fall asleep
 Virus latency, the ability of a virus to remain dormant

Engineering
 Latency (engineering), a measure of the time delay experienced by a system
 Latency (audio), the delay necessitated by the conversion between analog and digital representations of sound data
 CAS latency, computer memory latency
 Network latency or network delay, a measure of the time delay required for information to travel across a network
 Rotational latency, the delay waiting for the rotation of the disk to bring the required disk sector under the read-write head
 Mechanical latency

Other uses
 Latency stage, a term coined by Sigmund Freud for a stage in a child's psychosexual development
 Latent Recordings, an independent Canadian record label
 Nuclear latency, the condition of a country capable of developing nuclear weapons but not yet possessing them